Martinique is a Single territorial collectivity of France. Martinique elects one deputy to the national assembly from each of four constituencies. It elects on regional/départemental level a legislature, called the Assembly of Martinique, by proportional representation from each of the national assembly constituencies.

The Assembly of Martinique replaced, in 2015, two councils with diverging powers. These were the Regional Council (Conseil régional) with 41 members, elected for a four-year term by proportional representation and the General Council (Conseil général) with members elected for a six-year term in single seat-constituencies.

Martinique has a multi-party system, with numerous parties in which no one party often has a chance of gaining power alone, and parties must work with each other to form coalition governments.

Last elections
The first elections for the Assembly of Martinique were held on 13 December 2015.
Gran Sanblé pou ba peyi an chans, a coalition of the Martinican Independence Movement and right-wing parties, led by Alfred Marie-Jeanne defeated , a coalition of left-wing parties, led by Serge Letchimy, winning 33 out of 51 seats.

Past elections

2004 Regional Elections

Seats

1998 Regional Elections

1992 Regional Elections

1986 Regional Elections

See also
 Electoral calendar
 Electoral system

References